François Makita (born 6 May 1963) is a Congolese former professional footballer who played as a forward. He represented the Republic of the Congo national team internationally from 1984 to 1993.

Career
Born in Brazzaville, Makita began playing youth football for local sides, debuting in 1977 with CS Negro and later playing for CARA Brazzaville. In 1984, he moved to France to play for Montelimar. He would play in Ligue 2 for AS Saint-Étienne before finishing his career with several lower-tier French clubs.

Makita made several appearances for the Congo national team, including one FIFA World Cup qualifying match, and he participated at the 1992 African Cup of Nations finals.

After retiring from playing, Makita became a football manager. He was briefly the manager of US Argenton.

References

External links

Profile at Anciensverts.com

1963 births
Living people
Sportspeople from Brazzaville
Association football forwards
Republic of the Congo footballers
Republic of the Congo international footballers
1992 African Cup of Nations players
CARA Brazzaville players
AS Saint-Étienne players
Nîmes Olympique players
Louhans-Cuiseaux FC players
RC Épernay Champagne players
Ligue 2 players
Republic of the Congo expatriate footballers
Republic of the Congo expatriate sportspeople in France
Expatriate footballers in France